Mare Spumans  (Latin spūmāns, the "foaming sea") is a lunar mare located just south of Mare Undarum on the lunar near side.  It is one of the many elevated lakes contained in the Crisium basin, surrounding Mare Crisium.  The surrounding basin material is of the Nectarian epoch, while the mare basalt being of the Upper Imbrian epoch. The crater Petit (formerly ) is located on the western rim of the mare. This crater is white and surrounded by a well-defined ray system.

See also
Volcanism on the Moon

References

Spumans
Spumans
Spumans